Bronco is a Mexican grupero band from Apodaca, Nuevo León. Their modern take on regional Mexican music in the 1980s and 1990s helped earn them a number of international hits. Band members José Guadalupe Esparza, Ramiro Delgado, Javier Villareal and José Luis "Choche" Villareal crafted a sound that paid tribute to the norteño tradition while incorporating modern instruments like keyboards, as well as a more melodic, pop style with elaborate jumpsuits.

By 1990, Bronco proved that they were gaining large scale fame, in part due to the band's participation as protagonists of the film Bronco La Película (Bronco: The Movie), in which all four members of the band played a role.

Bronco experienced international fame with help from their international hit Que No Quede Huella (May No Traces Be Left) from their 1989 album A Todo Galope, for which they toured the United States, Puerto Rico, Spain, Argentina, Venezuela, Peru and many other countries. They gained additional fame in 1993, when they acted in the Televisa soap opera, Dos Mujeres, un Camino (Two Women, one Road), alongside Erik Estrada, Laura León, Lorena Herrera, Selena and Bibi Gaytán, among others. In addition to acting, they performed the opening song, which was titled like the show. The album Pura Sangre, which included the song Dos Mujeres, un Camino, earned gold and platinum records in Mexico, Chile, Argentina, Bolivia and Paraguay. Many of Bronco's albums have achieved solid sales in the United States.

After Esparza announced he was going to pursue a solo career in 1997, the group broke up.  After six years, in 2003, the band members finally announced a return, and later that year, they reunited. They intended to use the name Bronco in Mexico again, but rather than draw out a dispute over the copyrighted band name with their ex-manager, they chose to go by the name El Gigante de America, this being the nickname their fans gave them during their quarter century as Bronco. Despite not being able to perform as Bronco in Mexico for several years, the band still used the name for their international concerts, where Mexican copyright laws did not count. Since 2017, they have been legally allowed to perform as Bronco in Mexico again. 

Grupo Bronco has sold over 10 million albums to date.

In February 2012, original keyboardist and accordionist Erick Garza was kidnapped and murdered in Monterrey, Nuevo León.

José Luis Villarreal ("Choche") died on September 30, 2012, at age 55, in Apodaca, Nuevo León, Mexico. He had suffered for his last few years with cirrhosis of the liver.

In April 2019, Ramiro Delgado left the band and filed a lawsuit against Lupe Esparza, accusing the latter of fraud and monetary mismanagement. Esparza was interviewed and claimed that all debt owed to Ramiro Delgado was being taken care of. Delgado's son, Ramiro Delgado Jr., replaced his father as Bronco's keyboardist and accordionist. In January 5th 2021, Ramiro Delgado Jr. left the band.

On January 12, 2021, Arsenio Guajardo was presented as new keyboardist and accordionist for the band. Guajardo has previously worked with Los Trotamundos and Los Humildes.

Albums
2019 — Bronco : La Serie
2019 — Por Mas
2017 — Primera Fila (first album as Bronco since 1997)
2015 — Indestructible (last album as El Gigante de América)
2015 — En Vivo desde Monterrey Vol. 2
2014 —  En Vivo desde Monterrey
2013 — Por puro gusto
2012 — Por siempre tuyo
2010 — De Sangre Norteña
2009 — El Mundo No Se Detiene  
2007 — Más Broncos Que Nunca  (first album on Fonovisa)
2007 — Sin Fronteras...En Vivo
2006 — Huella Digital (last album on Ariola)
2005 — Por Ti  
2004 — Sin Riendas2003 — Siempre Arriba (first album as El Gigante de América)
1998 — Hasta Siempre...Bronco El Ultimo Concierto (last album as Bronco)
1997 — La Última Huella1996 — Homenaje A Los Grandes Grupos1995 — Animal1994 — Rompiendo Barreras1993 — Pura Sangre1992 — Por El Mundo1991 — Salvaje Y Tierno1990 — Amigo Bronco1989 — A Todo Galope1988 — Un Golpe Más1987 — Súper Bronco1986 — Indomable1985 — Sergio el Bailador (first album on Ariola)
1984 — Bailando Jalao (last album on Disa)
1983 — Grande De Caderas1982 — Tu prieto (first album on Disa) 
1980 — Te quiero cada día más'' (debut album) (only album on Fama)

References

Mexican musical groups
Musical groups from Apodaca
Mexican norteño musical groups
Musical groups from Monterrey
Fonovisa Records artists
Grupera music groups
1979 establishments in Mexico